Neodyscrasis steyskali is a species of ulidiid or picture-winged fly in the genus Neodyscrasis of the family Ulidiidae.

Distribution
Mexico.

References

Ulidiidae
Insects described in 1988
Diptera of North America
Endemic insects of Mexico